Joris Jehan (born September 9, 1989 in Vénissieux) is a French football player, who played for Mont's D'Or Azergues Chasselay.

Career

Club 
The midfielder played during his youth career for US Vénissieux, Olympique Lyonnais, CA Cascol Oullins Foot, AC Le Havre, CS Louhans-Cuiseaux and CS Sedan Ardennes.

He earned his first caps for the reserve team of CS Sedan Ardennes with the reserve team in the Championnat de France amateur. He left in summer 2008 France and signed with Belgium side R. Charleroi S.C. He played in one and a half year, only one game and left in December 2010 his club Charleroi, to sign for RFC Wallonia Walhain. He played the season with Wallonia to End and moved in June 2010 to Cyprus League club AEK Larnaca. After one year of Cyprus, returned in July 2011 to France and signed for Championnat de France amateur club MDA Chasselay.

International 
Jehan earned only one match in 2007 with the France national under-18 football team.

References

1989 births
Living people
R. Charleroi S.C. players
French footballers
French expatriate footballers
AEK Larnaca FC players
French expatriate sportspeople in Belgium
CS Sedan Ardennes players
Association football midfielders
Olympique Lyonnais players
People from Vénissieux
Louhans-Cuiseaux FC players
Association football defenders
Le Havre AC players
France youth international footballers
Sportspeople from Lyon Metropolis
Footballers from Auvergne-Rhône-Alpes